Barra del Río Bueno or La Barra is a hamlet located at coast of Osorno Province, southern Chile. The hamlet lies at the outflow of Bueno River into the Pacific Ocean.

References

Populated coastal places in Chile
Populated places in Osorno Province
Coasts of Los Lagos Region